A spoon is an eating or cooking implement, consisting of a small oval or round shallow bowl with a handle.

Spoon may also refer to:

Sport
 Spoon (golf), a wooden golf club, equivalent to a 3 wood
 Spoon Inc., Japanese motorsports equipment manufacturer
 Spoon lure, a fishing lure shaped like the bowl of a spoon
 Spoon oar (sport rowing), one with a curved blade

Music
Spoon Records, an independent label
Spoon (band), an indie rock band from the U.S. city of Austin, Texas
"Spoon" (Can song), 1972
"Spoon" (Dave Matthews Band song), 1998
"Spoon", a Cibo Matto song
Spoon (musical instrument)
Spoon (Spoon album), 1994
Spoon (Akina Nakamori album), 1998

People
Spoon Jackson (born 1957), American prison inmate and award-winning poet
"Spoon" Will Witherspoon (born 1980), American football player
Brandon Spoon (born 1978), American former National Football League player
Dave Spoon (born 1977), BBC radio disc jockey and dance music producer
Rae Spoon, Canadian folk/indie singer and songwriter
Jake Spoon, fictional Texas Ranger in two Lonesome Dove novels

Other uses
Spoon theory, a disability metaphor used to explain the reduced amount of energy available for activities of daily living and productive tasks that may result from disability or chronic illness.
Spoon (liturgy), in Eastern Orthodox religion
Spoon River, in the U.S. state of Illinois
Spoon (TV program), a Philippine cooking talk show
"Spoon", an episode of The Protector
Echiura or spoon worms, a small group of marine animals
"Spoon" is also used as a short form of Spoon Radio, a South Korean audio-only live streaming platform
Pulsar Spoon, a line of retro styled watches by Pulsar (watch)
Spoon, the former name for Turbo (software), a set of software products and products from Code Systems Corporation
"Spoon", the Wooden Spoon Society charity

See also
Spooning (disambiguation)
Spoons (disambiguation)